Lorenzo Bardini (born 12 April 1996) is an Italian football player. He plays for Vastese.

Club career
He made his Serie C debut for Prato on 31 January 2016 in a game against Robur Siena.

On 26 February 2019, he signed with Catania.

On 16 July 2019 he joined Serie D club Vastese.

References

External links
 

1996 births
Sportspeople from Livorno
Living people
Italian footballers
Italy youth international footballers
ACF Fiorentina players
A.C. Prato players
A.C. Cesena players
Catania S.S.D. players
Vastese Calcio 1902 players
Serie B players
Serie C players
Serie D players
Association football goalkeepers
Footballers from Tuscany